Answer was a small galleon in the service of the English Royal Navy. She spent her early career in expeditions as far as Cadiz and the Azores. She was later assigned to the Channel Guard during two more attempts by Philip II of Spain to invade England. She maintained this assignment until she went to the Irish Station then back to the English Channel. She was finally sold in 1629.

Answer was the first named vessel in the English and Royal Navies.

Construction and specifications
She was built on the Thames possibly at Deptford under the guidance of Master Shipwright Richard Chapman. She was launched in 1590. Her tonnage was between 202.9 and 253.5 tons.

Her gun armament was in 1603 19 guns consisting of five demi-culverines, six sakers, six minions and two falcons plus two fowlers Her manning was around 100 officers and men in 1603.

Commissioned service
She was commissioned in 1599 thru 1600 under Captain Walter Gore for service with Sir Richard Leveson's Channel Guard in 1599. She was with the Channel Guard until July 1599. In 1601 she was under Captain Thomas Coverte for the Thames Guard. In 1602 she was under the command of Captain Matthew Bardgate for service in the English Channel. She was rebuilt at Chatham Dockyard in May 1604.

Disposition
Answer was sold at Rochester on 17 June 1629.

Notes

Citations

References
 British Warships in the Age of Sail (1603 – 1714), by Rif Winfield, published by Seaforth Publishing, England © Rif Winfield 2009, EPUB , Chapter 4, The Fourth Rates - 'Small Ships', Vessels in service or on order at 24 March 1603, Crane Group. Answer
 Ships of the Royal Navy, by J.J. Colledge, revised and updated by Lt-Cdr Ben Warlow and Steve Bush, published by Seaforth Publishing, Barnsley, Great Britain, © the estate of J.J. Colledge, Ben Warlow and Steve Bush 2020, EPUB , Section A (Answer)
 The Arming and Fitting of English Ships of War 1600 - 1815, by Brian Lavery, published by US Naval Institute Press © Brian Lavery 1989, Part V Guns, Type of Guns

 

Ships of the Royal Navy
16th-century ships